The Rockaway Township Public Schools is a comprehensive community public school district that serves students in pre-kindergarten through eighth grade in Rockaway Township, in Morris County, New Jersey, United States.

As of the 2018–19 school year, the district, comprised of six schools, had an enrollment of 2,276 students and 224.5 classroom teachers (on an FTE basis), for a student–teacher ratio of 10.1:1.

The district is classified by the New Jersey Department of Education as being in District Factor Group "I", the second-highest of eight groupings. District Factor Groups organize districts statewide to allow comparison by common socioeconomic characteristics of the local districts. From lowest socioeconomic status to highest, the categories are A, B, CD, DE, FG, GH, I and J.

Public school students in ninth through twelfth grades attend either Morris Hills High School (those living in the White Meadow Lake section and other southern portions of the township) or Morris Knolls High School (the remainder of the township). Morris Hills (located in Rockaway Borough) also serves students from Wharton and some from Rockaway Borough (those mostly north of Route 46); Morris Knolls (located in Denville) serves all students from Denville and portions of Rockaway Borough (those mostly south of Route 46). As of the 2018–19 school year, Morris Hills High School had an enrollment of 1,279 students and 118.4 classroom teachers (on an FTE basis), for a student–teacher ratio of 10.8:1 and Morris Knolls High School had an enrollment of 1,434 students and 128.4 classroom teachers (on an FTE basis), for a student–teacher ratio of 11.2:1. The Academy for Mathematics, Science, and Engineering, a magnet high school program that is part of the Morris County Vocational School District is jointly operated on the Morris Hills campus. The two high schools are part of the Morris Hills Regional High School District.

Schools 
Schools in the district (with 2018–19 enrollment data from the National Center for Education Statistics) are:
Elementary schools
Birchwood Elementary School with 281 students in grades K-5
Jennifer Macones, Principal
Catherine A. Dwyer Elementary School with 292 students in grades K-5
Michael McGovern, Principal
Katherine D. Malone Elementary School with 252 students in grades K-5
Bryan Flemming, Principal
Dennis B. O'Brien Elementary School with 309 students in grades PreK-5
Chris Maragon, Principal
Stony Brook Elementary School with 359 students in grades K-5
Stephen Wisniewski, Principal
Middle school
Copeland Middle School with 774 students in grades 6-8
Alfonso Gonnella, Principal

Administration
Core members of the district's administration are:
Dr. Peter Turnamian, Superintendent
Rachel DeCarlo

Board of education
The district's board of education, comprised of seven members, sets policy and oversees the fiscal and educational operation of the district through its administration. As a Type II school district, the board's trustees are elected directly by voters to serve three-year terms of office on a staggered basis, with either two or three seats up for election each year held (since 2012) as part of the November general election. The board appoints a superintendent to oversee the day-to-day operation of the district.

References

External links 
Rockaway Township Public Schools
 
Rockaway Township Public Schools, National Center for Education Statistics

New Jersey District Factor Group I
Rockaway Township, New Jersey
School districts in Morris County, New Jersey